Below is a partial list of shows that were previously aired on the defunct Philippine pay television channel, Yey!. For the final aired shows of this channel, see the list of programs broadcast by Yey!.

Previous programs
Note: Titles are listed in alphabetical order.

Anime series
 Ace of Diamond (season 1) (2018)
 Akuei & Gatchinpo
 Animazing Tales
 Anne of Green Gables
 Baka to test to shokanjuu (2011-2018, 2020)
 BeyWarriors: BeyRaiderz (2017)
 BeyWarriors: Cyborg (2017)
 BeyWheelz (2018)
 Blue Dragon (seasons 1–2)
 Boruto: Naruto Next Generations (cancelled, due to the alias cease-and-desist order (ACDO))
 Charlotte
 Cooking Master Boy (2018)
 Crush Gear series
 Crush Gear Turbo
 Crush Gear Nitro
 D.I.C.E.
 Digimon series
 Digimon Adventure
 Digimon Adventure 02
 Digimon Tamers
 Digimon Frontier
 Digimon Savers
 Digimon Xros Wars
 Digimon Adventure tri. (2018)
 Dog of Flanders
 Domo
 Doraemon (2019-2020)
 Element Hunters (2014)
 Eyeshield 21
 Free! (seasons 1–2) (2016)
 Gundam Seed Destiny
 Genki Bakuhatsu Ganbaruger
 Hitman Reborn!
 Inazuma Eleven
 Inazuma Eleven GO series
 Inazuma Eleven GO (season 1)
 Inazuma Eleven GO: Chrono Stone (2019)
 Inazuma Eleven GO: Galaxy (2019)
 Inuyasha
 Inuyasha: The Final Act
 Jang Geum's Dream
 Judy Abott
 Kirarin Revolution
 Kobato. (2015)
 Kuroko's Basketball (seasons 1–3)
 Little Battlers Experience
 Major (seasons 1–6)
 Lupin the Third Part II (2015-2016)
 Matchless Raijin-Oh
 Marcelino Pan y Vino
 Metal Fight Beyblade series
 Metal Fight Beyblade (season 1)
 Metal Fight Beyblade: Baku (2016)
 Metal Fight Beyblade 4D (2017)
 Metal Fight Beyblade Zero-G (2017)
 My Hero Academia (seasons 1–2) (2018)
 Naruto (All Episodes)
 Naruto: Shippūden (seasons 1–10) (All Episodes) 
 Nura: Rise of the Yokai Clan
 Nekketsu Saikyō Go-Saurer
 One-Punch Man (season 1) (2018)
 Peter Pan and Wendy
 Demashita Powerpuff Girls Z
 Princess Sarah
 Ragnarok the Animation
 Rascal The Raccoon (1977)
 Remi, Nobody's Girl
 Rental Magica (2015)
 Samurai X
 Shugo Chara!
 Sgt. Keroro
 Si Maria at ang Lihim na Hardin
 Superbook Classic
 Super Inggo at ang Super Tropa
 Tai Chi Chasers
 Tears to Tiara (2015)
 The Adventures of Tom Sawyer
 The Flying House
 The Trapp Family Singers
 Tokyo Magnitude 8.0 (2014)
 Umaru Chan (2017)
 Yowamushi Pedal (season 1) (2017)
 Yu-Gi-Oh! series
 Yu-Gi-Oh! Duel Monsters
 Yu-Gi-Oh! GX (seasons 1–2)
 Yu-Gi-Oh! 5Ds
 Yu-Gi-Oh! Zexal (seasons 1–2)
 Yu-Gi-Oh! Arc-V (seasons 1–2)
 Yumeiro Patissiere
 Zoids Genesis

Cartoons
 Action Man A.T.O.M.
 Adventures of Sonic the Hedgehog
 Bananas in Pyjamas (Cartoon version) (2016–2019)
 Beast Machines
 Beast Wars: Transformers
 Care Bears and Cousins
 Care Bears: Welcome to Care-a-Lot
 Dennis the Menace
 Galaxy Racers
 Happy Toons
 Johnny Test
 Magic Wonderland
 Max Steel
 Monk
 Monster Allergy
 Mr. Bean (S1, S2)
 PAW Patrol
 Peppa Pig (2016–2020, now on A2Z)
 Pleasant Goat and Big Big Wolf
 Pucca
 Rainbow Ruby  
 Rob the Robot  (now on A2Z)
 Robocar Poli
 Shalen
 Strawberry Shortcake's Berry Bitty Adventures (2017–2019)
 Superbook Reimagined
 Swirl Fighters
 Tayo the Little Bus
 Teenage Mutant Ninja Turtles: Fast Forward
 Thomas & Friends
 Voltron
 Voltron Force
 W.I.T.C.H.
 Winx Club (Moved to TV5)
 Wakfu

Nickelodeon
 Avatar: The Legend of Aang
 ChalkZone
 Danny Phantom
 Fanboy & Chum Chum
 Harvey Beaks
 Kung Fu Panda: Legends of Awesomeness
 Mighty Bug 5
 My Life as a Teenage Robot
 Robot and Monster
 Sanjay and Craig
 SpongeBob SquarePants (2015–2020)
 Teenage Mutant Ninja Turtles (2012 version)
 The Adventures of Jimmy Neutron: Boy Genius
 The Fairly OddParents
 The Legend of Korra
 The Loud House (2019–2020)
 The Mighty B!
 The Penguins of Madagascar
 T.U.F.F. Puppy

Nick Jr.
 Blaze and the Monster Machines
 Dora the Explorer (2015–2020)
 Go, Diego, Go!
 Ni Hao, Kai-Lan
 PAW Patrol
 Rusty Rivets (2020)
 Team Umizoomi
 Wonder Pets

Marvel
 Silver Surfer
 Spider-Man and His Amazing Friends

Live-action/Tokusatsu
 Halser Acre (2018)
 Power Rangers series
 Power Rangers Zeo
 Power Rangers Wild Force
 Power Rangers Ninja Storm
 Power Rangers Dino Thunder
 Power Rangers SPD
 Power Rangers Mystic Force
 Power Rangers Operation Overdrive
 Power Rangers Jungle Fury
 Power Rangers RPM
 Power Rangers Samurai/Super Samurai
 Power Rangers Megaforce
 Power Rangers Super Megaforce
 Power Rangers Dino Charge
 Ultraman series
 Ultraman Dyna
 Ultraman Gaia
 Ultraman Mebius
 Ultraman Max

Children's shows
 Sesame Street 
 The Furchester Hotel

Local programs
Original programs
 Team Yey!
 Season 1 (2016)
 Season 2 (2017)
 Season 3 (2018)
 Season 4 (2019)
 The Hanchies

Fantasy
 Kokey
 Kokey @ Ako
 Komiks
 Komiks Presents: Mars Ravelo series
 Kapitan Boom
 Varga
 Tiny Tony
 Dragonna
 Flash Bomba
 Komiks Presents: Pedro Penduko series
 Da Adventures of Pedro Penduko
 Pedro Penduko at ang mga Engkantao
 Kung Fu Kids
 Lastikman
 My Little Juan
 My Super D: Super Marathon
 Princess Sarah (Teleserye version)
 Starla 
 Super Inggo
 Wako Wako

Reality shows
 Dance Kids: Take 2
 Junior MasterChef Pinoy Edition
 Little Big Shots: Take 2
 The Kids' Choice: Take 2
 The Voice Kids, Season 1 – Take 2
 The Voice Kids, Season 2 – Take 2
 The Voice Kids, Season 3 – Take 2
 Your Face Sounds Familiar: Kids, Season 1 – Take 2
 Your Face Sounds Familiar: Kids, Season 2 – Take 2

U.S. TV shows
 Little Big Shots with Steve Harvey (2018)

Teleshopping
 O Shopping

See also
List of programs broadcast by Yey!
List of Philippine television shows
Hero TV (defunct channel)
ABS-CBN

Yey!
Yey!